Pasqual Martínez (1899 – death date unknown) was a Cuban pitcher in the Negro leagues in the 1920s.

A native of Cienfuegos, Cuba, Martínez played for the Cuban Stars (West) in 1924. In ten recorded games on the mound, he posted a 6.07 ERA over 56.1 innings.

References

External links
 and Baseball-Reference Black Baseball Stats and Seamheads

1899 births
Date of birth missing
Year of death missing
Place of death missing
Cuban Stars (West) players